Parliamentary elections will be held in Andorra on 2 April 2023.

Background 
Three parties eventually formed a governing coalition after the 2019 Andorran parliamentary election, composed of the Democrats, the Liberal Party and Committed Citizens with Xavier Espot Zamora as Prime Minister.

Electoral system 
Twenty-eight general councillors (Catalan: consellers generals) are elected, based on closed party lists:

 Fourteen general councillors representing the seven parishes (two councillors per parish) are elected from the list with most votes in each parish.
 Fourteen general councillors are elected from national lists using the largest remainder method of proportional representation.

The parish lists and the national list are independent of one another: the same person cannot appear on both the national list and on a parish list, and voters cast two separate ballots. There is no requirement to vote for the same party for both lists.

Parties and alliances

National constituency
The candidacies presented in the national constituency, in which 14 councilors are elected by proportional representation, are:

Parish constituencies

The parties or coalitions that are presented in the seven parish constituencies, in which the two candidates from the list with the most votes in each parish are elected, are:

Notes

References

External links
Official website

Andorra
Parliamentary
Andorra
2023 election
Parliamentary elections in Andorra